The Sagara clan (相良氏, Sagara-shi) was a Japanese samurai clan of daimyos. They were a tactical ally of the Shimazu clan.

In the Edo period, they became the daimyo of the Hitoyoshi Domain and ruled until the Meiji Restoration. After the restoration, they were appointed Viscount.

Origins 
The Sagara clan was founded by Sagara Korekane, descending from the Fujiwara clan. It is believed that the clan took its name from the manor (shōen) they held in Sagara, Haibara District, Tōtōmi Province during the Kamakura period.

History 
The Sagara clan was, in the Edo period, a tozama daimyō clan which ruled the Hitoyoshi Domain in Higo Province. The domain boasted land worth of 22,000 koku. In 1198, the year before his death, Minamoto no Yoritomo granted the territory of Hitoyoshi (on Kyushu, in modern-day Kumamoto prefecture) to the Sagara clan. Hitoyoshi is surrounded on all sides by mountains, making it quite easily defensible, and allowing the Sagara to relatively easily survive their neighbors' attacks during the Sengoku period.

Sagara Nagatsune initially fought alongside the Western Army (against Tokugawa Ieyasu) at the Battle of Sekigahara, but secretly sent an envoy to Ieyasu declaring his allegiance. When Ieyasu's forces laid siege to Nagatsune's Ôgaki castle, he granted the attackers entry, thus earning him some relief from Tokugawa enmity. After contributing as well to Tokugawa efforts during the Siege of Osaka, he earned a high reputation for his clan.

After the Meiji Restoration and the abolition of the han system, members of the Sagara clan were appointed hereditary nobility Kazoku with the title of Viscount.

Clan heads 

 Sagara Yorifusa
 Sagara Yorihiro
 Sagara Yoritaka
 Sagara Yoritomi
 Sagara Nagaoki
 Sagara Nagaari
 Sagara Yorimine
 Sagara Yorihisa
 Sagara Akinaga
 Sagara Yorisada
 Sagara Tomimochi
 Sagara Nagahiro
 Sagara Yorinori
 Sagara Yoriyuki
 Sagara Nagatomi
 Sagara Yorimoto
 Sagara Haruhiro
 Sagara Yoshihi

Vassal
 Indō Yoriyasu
 Akaike Nagatō
 Marume Nagayoshi
 Fukami Nagamoto

References 
 
Sengoku period
Fujiwara clan